The America–Israel Friendship League (AIFL) is an American/Israeli non-profit organization dedicated to strengthening ties between Americans and Israelis based on shared democratic values. The AIFL brings Americans of all faiths to Israel, and Israelis of all faiths (Jews, Christians and Muslims) to the United States.

History
The organization was founded in 1971 by Vice President Hubert Humphrey, U.S. Senators "Scoop" Jackson and Nelson Rockefeller, U.S. Representative Herbert Tenzer, civil rights leader A. Philip Randolph, and others. The AIFL sends delegations to Israel to forge U.S. business, technological, humanitarian and personal relationships with partners in Israel.

The AIFL's U.S. national office is located in New York City, and its Israeli office in Tel Aviv. It has three chapters located in Tucson, Arizona, San Francisco, California and Salt Lake City, Utah.  It most recently opened the Salt Lake City chapter.

AIFL leaders were among those who rang the opening bell at the New York Stock Exchange when the exchange celebrated its fifth annual Israel Day.

Programs 

Leadership Delegation - Every year delegate are sent to Israel in order to promote professional, educational opportunities and cultural exchange as a way to develop an understanding between the United States and Israel 
 Multifaith Outreach
 Think Tank
 Webinars

See also 
 Uri Bar-Ner

References

External links
Official website

1971 establishments in New York City
Israel friendship associations
Israeli-American culture in California
Israeli-American culture in New York City
Israel–United States relations
Organizations based in New York City
Organizations based in Tel Aviv
Organizations established in 1971
United States friendship associations
Zionism in the United States